The Disney logo is the corporate logo of The Walt Disney Company since 1956. It is based on a stylized autograph of Walt Disney. Aside from being used by The Walt Disney Company, various Disney divisions and products use the same style/font in their logos, although with some differences depending on the company.

The signature of Walt Disney has been considered the most recognized. The D in the Disney logo makes use of the golden ratio three times.

Variations

The Walt Disney Company 

The name of "The Walt Disney Company" has changed several times, and so has the logo.

The Walt Disney Studios 

The "Walt Disney Studios" logo have the words "Walt Disney" wordmark, and the font "The" and "Studios" is Benton Sans.

Disney General Entertainment Content 

The "Disney General Entertainment Content" logo showing the black Disney wordmark and the font "General Entertainment Content" is Benton Sans. The Walt Disney Television name was reinstated in March 2019 after Disney's acquisition of 21st Century Fox was completed. The logo showing the black "Walt Disney" wordmark and the font "Television" is also Benton Sans.

Disney Television Studios 

The "Disney Television Studios" logo showing the black Disney wordmark and the font "Television Studios" is Benton Sans.

Disney Branded Television 

The "Disney Branded Television" logo showing the black Disney wordmark and the font "Branded Television" is Benton Sans. The "Disney Channels Worldwide" logo showing the black Disney wordmark and the font "Channels Worldwide" is also Benton Sans.

Disney Entertainment 

The "Disney Entertainment" logo showing the black Disney wordmark and the font "Entertainment" is Benton Sans.

Disney Media and Entertainment Distribution 

The "Disney Media and Entertainment Distribution" logo showing the black Disney wordmark and the font "Media and Entertainment Distribution" is Benton Sans.

Disney–ABC Home Entertainment and Television Distribution 

The 2015 on-screen "Disney–ABC Home Entertainment and Television Distribution" showing the blue (black in the off-screen logo) Disney wordmark and the 2013 ABC logo is also blue (gray in the off-screen logo) and the font "Home Entertainment and Television Distribution" is Benton Sans in white (black in the off-screen logo) and also have a blue star (black line in the off-screen alternate logo) between the Disney logo and the ABC logo. The 2013 on-screen "Disney–ABC Domestic Television" showing the blue Disney wordmark and the 2013 ABC logo is also blue and the font "Domestic Television" is Benton Sans in white (gray in the off-screen primary logo) and also have a blue star between the Disney logo and the ABC logo. The 2007 on-screen "Disney–ABC Domestic Television" showing the blue Disney wordmark and the 2007 (static in the off-screen logo) ABC logo (also blue in the off-screen logo) and the font "Domestic Television" is in white (gray in the off-screen logo) and also have a blue star between the Disney logo and the ABC logo.

Disney Star 

On April 14, 2022, Star India officially rebranded as "Disney Star", three years after its acquisition by Disney. The orange Star logo from 2016 has been placed next to the iconic Disney logo.

Disney Consumer Products 

The "Disney Consumer Products" logo showing the blue Disney wordmark and the font "Consumer Products" is Benton Sans is also Blue.

Disney Platform Distribution 

The "Disney Platform Distribution" logo showing the black Disney wordmark and the font "Platform Distribution" is Benton Sans. The on-screen "Disney Media Distribution" logo showing the white (black in the off-screen logo) Disney wordmark and the font "Media Distribution" is Benton Sans.

Walt Disney Pictures 

Until 1985, instead of a traditional production logo, the opening credits of Disney films used to feature a title card that read "Walt Disney Presents", and later, "Walt Disney Productions Presents". In Never Cry Wolf, and the pre-release versions of Splash, it showed a light blue rectangle with the name "Walt Disney Pictures" and featured a white outline rectangle framing on a black screen.

Beginning with the release of Return to Oz in 1985, Walt Disney Pictures introduced its fantasy castle logo. The version with its accompanying music premiered with The Black Cauldron. The logo was created by Walt Disney Productions in traditional animation and featured a white silhouette of Disneyland's Sleeping Beauty Castle against a blue background, with the studio's name in Walt Disney text and underscored by "When You Wish Upon a Star", in arrangement composed by John Debney. A short rendition of the logo was used as a closing logo as well as in the movie Return to Oz, although the film was released months before The Black Cauldron was released. A computer-animated RenderMan variant appeared before every Pixar Animation Studios film from Toy Story until Ratatouille, featuring an original fanfare composed by Randy Newman, based on the opening score cue from Toy Story. Beginning with Dinosaur (2000), an alternative logo featuring an orange castle and logo against a black background, was occasionally presented with darker tone and live-action films, though a few animated films such as Brother Bear, the 2003 re-release of The Lion King and The Wild (the final film to use this logo) used this logo. The original incarnation of this logo resurfaced in 2021 for a merchandising line by ShopDisney, based on its original incarnation.

In 2006, the studio's vanity card logo was updated with the release of Pirates of the Caribbean: Dead Man's Chest at the behest of then-Walt Disney Studios chairman Dick Cook and studio marketing president Oren Aviv. Designed by Disney animation director Mike Gabriel and producer Baker Bloodworth, the modernized logo was created completely in computer animation by Wētā FX and yU+co and featured a 3D New Waltograph typography. The final rendering of the logo was done by Cameron Smith and Cyrese Parrish. In addition, the revamped logo includes visual references to Pinocchio, Dumbo, Cinderella, Peter Pan and Mary Poppins, and its redesigned castle incorporates elements from both the Cinderella Castle and the Sleeping Beauty Castle, as well as fireworks and Walt Disney's family crest. Mark Mancina wrote a new composition and arrangement of "When You Wish Upon a Star" to accompany the 2006 logo. It was co-arranged and orchestrated by David Metzger. In 2011, starting with The Muppets, the sequence was modified to truncate the "Walt Disney Pictures" branding to "Disney", which has mainly been used originally in home media releases since 2007. The new logo sequence has been consistently modified for high-profile releases including Tron: Legacy, Maleficent, Tomorrowland, The Jungle Book, Beauty and the Beast, The Lion King, Mulan, Hocus Pocus 2, and Disenchanted.

In 2022, a new production logo was introduced for the studio's 100th anniversary in 2023, which premiered at the 2022 D23 Expo. The new castle logo features an updated opening sequence in computer animation at sunrise created by Disney Studios Content and Industrial Light & Magic and an arrangement of "When You Wish Upon a Star" by Christophe Beck. The magical arc that usually flies from right to left above the castle now flies from left to right, a subtle reference to several arc appearances since 2005, including the 2005 Hong Kong Disneyland logo, drawing the 2006 Walt Disney Pictures print logo and most recently, the animated Disney+ logo. A byline appears below the Disney100 logo during the studio's 100th anniversary in 2023, reading "100 Years of Wonder". While containing the same visual references as the previous logo, new references added to it include Pocahontas, Up, Hercules, The Hunchback of Notre Dame, Snow White and the Seven Dwarfs, The Little Mermaid, Tangled, Brave and Beauty and the Beast, with the addition of the Matterhorn from Third Man on the Mountain and its Disneyland attraction and Pride Rock from The Lion King in the background beyond the castle. Its first film appearance was with the release of Strange World.

Walt Disney Pictures presents 
From 1985 to 2007, Walt Disney Pictures marketed their films, regardless if they were live action or animated (except for Pixar films), with the tagline "Walt Disney Pictures presents" above the title.

Walt Disney Animation Studios 

The logo of Walt Disney Animation Studios was changed several times since its inception as a spin-off from Walt Disney Pictures. Starting in 2007, it uses a sketchier version of the signature corporate font accompanied with "ANIMATION STUDIOS" in reddish-orange, underneath.

DisneyToon Studios 

In 2011, the logo was updated. DisneyToon Studios closed its doors on June 28, 2018, resulting in a layoff of 75 animators and staff. As a result, the studio's third Planes film about the future of aviation in outer space was removed from both Disney's film release date schedule and from development.

Disney DVD 

"Disney DVD" is a brand name used on DVD releases from Walt Disney Studios Home Entertainment. Although it was introduced as a print logo with Disney's first DVD releases in 1997 and a semi-animated version of it appeared on some Disney VHS bumpers in 1999, it did not receive an official animated version until the release of Snow White and the Seven Dwarfs Platinum Edition in 2001.

Disney Blu-ray 

"Disney Blu-ray" is the brand name under which Walt Disney Studios Home Entertainment releases its Disney-branded motion pictures in high-definition. In 2006, Disney began releasing its titles, including the Pirates of the Caribbean films, the National Treasure films, and the first two Narnia films on Blu-ray.

Disney Channel 
The original Disney Channel logo was featured a rounded TV screen with horizontal lines and a Mickey Mouse silhouette. 
The lettering below the logo was changed in May 1986 to resemble the wordmark of the newly-renamed The Walt Disney Company. The wordmark was sometimes seen without the TV screen with the silhouette of Mickey Mouse's head or vice versa.

The modern Disney Channel logo has evolved starting from 2002. From 2002 to 2010, it used an outline of Mickey Mouse's head with "Disney Channel" in it, called "the Mickey head".  From 2010 to 2014, a variant of the Mickey head was used, in which the head was partially enclosed in a rounded box.

Starting in 2014, the Mickey head was dropped altogether in favor of a new 3D logo, in which the "i" in "Disney" had mouse ears. From 2017 to 2019, the logo became 2D, and since 2019, gradient variations have been in full use.

Playhouse Disney 

After The Disney Channel premiered three new original preschool series in 1998 (PB&J Otter, Rolie Polie Olie, and Out of the Box), the block became Playhouse Disney on February 1, 1999.

In March 2001, Playhouse Disney was renamed to Playhouse Disney Channel (although the channel was still using its previous name in advertising) and was given a new look. Even though the Mickey TV set version of this logo was phased out in 2002, the version without it continued to be used until 2011.

Alongside Disney Channel, on September 30, 2002, the network got a rebrand and the word "CHANNEL" was dropped from its name again, thus the original name was reinstated.

On May 10, 2010, Playhouse Disney updated its on-air look and began using a logo similar to the Disney Channel logo from that same year.

Disney XD 
The merger of Toon Disney and Jetix created a new channel called Disney XD on February 13, 2009. According to Disney, there is no particular reason why the phrase "XD" was chosen.

On June 1, 2015, Disney XD revealed a new updated logo, restyled in Argentina by 2veinte as part of the channel's worldwide rebranding.

Disney Cinemagic 

When Disney Cinemagic was launched back in 2006, the logo was considerably different from logos of other Disney channels at the time. On September 3, 2007, Disney Cinemagic received a new logo that was more in line with the other Disney Channel logos. On March 28, 2013, in the UK & Ireland, the channel was shut down and replaced by Sky Cinema Disney. In France the channel was renamed Disney Cinema in 2015. The final channel in Germany was shut down on September 30, 2019, bringing the "Cinemagic" brand to an end after 12 years of its existence.

Disney Cinema 

On May 8, 2015, Disney Cinemagic changed its name to Disney Cinema. Disney Cinema and Disney XD were closed on April 7, 2020, after the launch of Disney+ in France.

Disney Parks, Experiences and Products, Inc. 

The "Disney Parks, Experiences and Products" logo showing the black Disney wordmark and the font "Parks, Experiences and Products" is Benton Sans. The "Disney Parks" logo incorporates the Disney wordmark, with "Parks" in a matching script.

Walt Disney World 

The Walt Disney World logo switched over to the famous "Walt Disney" wordmark for the first two words, with "World" set in Times New Roman. One of the earliest instances of the usage of this logo would have to be the 1996 Windows and Macintosh computer software application The Walt Disney World Explorer and early merchandising for the resort's 25th-anniversary celebrations.

Disneyland Paris 

The Disneyland Paris logo showing the Disney wordmark, with "Land" in a matching script is blue, the word "Paris" is also in blue, used in 2015-present.

Hong Kong Disneyland Resort 

The Hong Kong Disneyland Resort logo showing the "Disney" wordmark, with "Land" in a matching script is red, the word "Hong Kong" is in black, similar with the Disneyland Paris logo.

Disney Institute 

The Disney Institute logo showing the red Disney wordmark and inside  
the letter "D" have a letter "I" and the word "Institute" is black.

Disney+ 

The Disney+ logo consists of Disney next to a stylized plus sign below a light-blue/white (or light-blue/dark blue) gradient arc.

Disney+ Hotstar 

A new Hotstar app, modified to show the Disney+ logo, was introduced on March 11, 2020 along with Disney+ content, with the official launch of the app being on April 3. The service expanded into Asia starting with Indonesia on September 5, 2020 and in Malaysia in June 1, 2021 and Thailand in June 30, 2021. It is stated to launch in Vietnam in early 2023.

Disney DELUXE 

The "Disney DELUXE" (ディズニーデラックス) logo showing the black Disney Wordmark, the big word "DELUXE" is black and the letter "X" is black and white. This streaming service was only released in Japan until June 11, 2020, when it was replaced by Disney+.

DisneyNow 

The DisneyNow logo showing the Disney wordmark with color blue (which also varies in every color), the word "NOW" is also in blue and the letter "O" showing with the play button.

Disney Princess 

The Disney Princess logo showing the pink Disney wordmark, and the word "Princess" is also pink, and inside the letter "P" have a crown.

Disneynature 

The Disneynature logo showing the green Disney wordmark, and the word   
"Nature" is also green, The label's event films are released on Earth Day and have a conservation campaign based on the feature of the film with an appropriate conservation charity receiving donations based on tickets sold, at a pace of one per year.

Disney Interactive 

The Disney Interactive logo showing the Disney logo with "INTER" and "ACTIVE" stacked below it with a red square with the Disney "D", with the "i" dot on top cut out of it. This logo is also usually superimposed onto the intro of the game.

Disney Mobile 

The Disney Mobile logo showing the black Disney wordmark, and the word "Mobile" is also black, The service started on March 1, 2008, acceptance of new contracts and model changes for existing users ended on September 30, 2015, and the provision of all services ended on November 30, 2017 (prior to this, For some terminals, the maximum communication speed on the 3G network will be lowered from April of the same year due to the termination of the DC-HSDPA service that uses the 1.5GHz band). Disney uses a method called MVNO (Virtual Mobile Network Operator) in which Disney rents a communication network (3G network. Later, 3.9G network is also used) from other mobile phone operators to provide services. As such, Disney and Softbank will be separate telecommunications carriers. The two companies claim that the service is a comprehensive collaboration between the two companies and is different from a mere MVNO. This will be the first Asian entry into the 3G voice service MVNO mobile phone business. After the end of service in 2017, mobile phones such as voice calls and data communication will not be available. At this point, no measures or measures have been clarified for winding up Softbank contracts, etc. On February 1, 2012, an outline of Disney Mobile on DoCoMo was announced. Unlike Softbank, it will be a form of providing terminals and services bearing the Disney name as one of Docomo's brands, so if existing Docomo customers switch, they will be treated as contract changes and terminal additions. The actual service started on February 22, when sales of the terminal started and ended on August 22, 2021.

Disney Theatrical Productions 

The Disney Theatrical Productions logo showing the blue Disney wordmark, and the word "Theatrical Productions Ltd." is also blue. was formed on February 8, 1993 with Ron Logan, Disney Park's live production head, as president to produce Beauty and the Beast. Beauty and the Beast opened on Broadway at the Palace Theatre on April 18, 1994. Disney Theatrical signed a 49-year revenue-based lease for New Amsterdam Theatre in May 1995. The building was renovated by Disney Development Company. With The Lion King under consideration for the next Broadway adaption, Eisner ceded DTP to theatre-rooted Disney Animation president Peter Schneider and Thomas Schumacher, at their request, making them president and executive vice president of DTP respectively. In 1997, DTP re-opened the New Amsterdam Theatre with King David followed by The Lion King musical.

Walt Disney Records 

Walt Disney Records was known as "Disneyland Records" from 1956 to 1988. It was Disney records for the remainder of 1988 and was used for early CDs and was used for Oliver & Company and Silly Songs. It was named "Walt Disney Records" in 1989, starting with The Little Mermaid. There were two variants for the logo; just the words "Walt Disney Records" for one, and one with the Sorcerer's Apprentice Mickey Mouse in another. The 1995 film Toy Story, meanwhile, didn't utilize any of those logos. Instead, the logo was in the font Pixar chose for the credit titles of Toy Story; this logo was used until 2005. In 1996, animated movies used the logo with Mickey Mouse conducting either a band, orchestra, or choir in a circle. This was used for animated Disney films and live-action films since 1998. Pixar used this logo from 1998 with A Bug's Life until 2007 with Ratatouille. In 2008, the logo had the words "Walt Disney" on the top and "Records" on the bottom. This logo is still used today. In 2016, Walt Disney Animation Studios reverted back to the 1996–2007 logo starting with Zootopia.

Disney 100 Years of Wonder 

Disney 100 Years of Wonder is a special logo created for the 100th anniversary of the Walt Disney Company in 2023. It had the "1" drawn normally and the "00" drawn similarly to the infinity sign "∞", with the "100 YEARS OF WONDER" text underneath. There are also foreign-language versions of the anniversary logo, which replacing "100 YEARS OF WONDER" slogan with their respective languages and also a "Disney100" logo without any slogan.

Lawsuit 
In 1999, GoTo.com sued Go.com, owned by Disney, for alleged similar look of their logo.

References 

Logos
Commercial logos
Television network logos
Walt Disney
Disney logos